Raphitoma strucki is a species of sea snail, a marine gastropod mollusk in the family Raphitomidae.

Description
The length of the shell reaches 5.5 mm.

The shell has a turreted fusiform shape, with a produced spire and deep sutures. The color of the shell is reddish brown. It contains nine, straight ribs, decussated and rendered nodulous by spiral riblets. The sinus is nearly obsolete. The outer lip is thickened and dentate.

Distribution
This marine species occurs in the Atlantic Ocean off Senegal.

References

External links
 Maltzan H.F. von. (1883). Beiträge zur Kenntnis der senegambischen Pleurotomiden. Jahrbücher der Deutschen Malakozoologischen Gesellschaft. 10: 115–135, pl. 3
 Dautzenberg P. (1910). Contribution à la faune malacologique de l'Afrique occidentale. Actes de la Société Linnéenne de Bordeaux. 64: 47-228, pls 1-4
 

strucki
Gastropods described in 1883